Metapenaeus ensis (sometimes called the greasyback shrimp or sand shrimp) is a species of prawn.

Distribution
Metapenaeus ensis is found in the waters of the Indo-West Pacific Region. The shrimp is found in brackish waters with depths between 8 and 95 metres.

The shrimp is found amongst commercial fisheries farms in Lau Fau Shan to Mai Po in Hong Kong.

Usage
The shrimp is fished commercially and sometimes used as bait.

References

Penaeidae
Crustaceans of the Indian Ocean
Crustaceans of the Pacific Ocean
Crustaceans described in 1844
Taxa named by Wilhem de Haan